Dachnoye was a temporary station on the Kirovsko-Vyborgskaya Line of the Saint Petersburg Metro. It was designed by architect Kseniya Afonskaya and opened on June 1, 1966. The station was created to serve the transportation needs of nearby neighborhoods until the Leninisky Prospekt-Prospekt Veteranov segment could be completed. Dachnoye was an above-ground station, with trains arriving and departing at one end. To save cost the station was constructed in the cheapest manner possible, with platform and the weather covering being made out of precast concrete panels.  On 5 October 1977, the Leninskiy Prospect-Prospect Veteranov segment was completed and the station was taken out of service. The rails leading up to it were disassembled and the station itself was enclosed in a larger building that was later converted into local traffic police headquarters.

Sources 
Станция "Дачное" (станция уничтожена) (in Russian)

Saint Petersburg Metro stations
Railway stations in Russia opened in 1966
Railway stations closed in 1977